Nectria mammoidea var. rubi is a plant pathogen.

References

Fungal plant pathogens and diseases
mammoidea var. rubi
Fungi described in 1911